Moscardó, Moscardo is a Spanish surname. Notable people with the surname include: 

 Jerônimo Moscardo (born 1940), Brazilian diplomat
 José Moscardó Ituarte (1878–1956), Spanish general
 Pasqual Sanchis Moscardó (born 1963), Spanish Valencian pilotari
 Vicente Moscardó (born 1987), Spanish footballer

Spanish-language surnames